Gildas Arzel (born 21 January 1961) is a French singer, songwriter, and multi-instrumentalist from Alsace. In addition to his solo career, he has been in musical formations such as the duo Die Form, with Erick Benzi; the group Canada (with Benzi, Jacques Veneruso, and Gwenn Arzel); and since 2007, El Club, with Benzi, Michael Jones, and Christian Seguret (fr).

Arzel began his solo career playing a mix of Irish and Scottish folk, blues, rock, Cajun, Celtic, and ethnic music. He has written a number of songs for and collaborated with Celine Dion, Johnny Hallyday, Roch Voisine, Jean-Jacques Goldman, Carole Fredericks, Michael Jones, Maurane, Nanette Workman, Florent Pagny, Yannick Noah, France D'Amour, J.A.H.O., and others.

Discography

Solo
 Les gens du voyage (1991)
 Entrer dans la danse (1994)
 Gildas Arzel (1997)
 Autour de nous (2001)
 Greneville (2015)

Other work
with Canada
(Gildas Arzel, Gween Arzel, Erick Benzi, Jacques Veneruso)
 Sur les traces (1988)

with Gabriel Yacoub
 Quatre (1994)

with Céline Dion
(Gildas Arzel, Erick Benzi, Jean-Jacques Goldman, Jacques Veneruso)
 1 fille & 4 types (2003)

with El Club
(Gildas Arzel, Erick Benzi, Michael Jones, Christian Seguret)
 Plus fort que ça (2007)

References

French male singers
French singer-songwriters
French composers
1961 births
Living people
French male singer-songwriters